Ndala is a Mozambican village.

Ndala may also refer to:

People

Given name
Ndala Ibrahim (born 1985), Nigerian footballer
Ndala Kasheba (died 2004), Congolese guitarist
Ndala Monga (born 1986), Congolese football goalkeeper

Surname
Addo Ndala (born 1973), Congolese hurdler
Blaise Ndala, Canadian author
Mamadou Ndala (1978–2014), Congolese colonel